Sir William Westbrooke Burton (31 January 1794 – 6 August 1888) was a judge and President of the Legislative Council, New South Wales, Australia.

Early life
Burton was born in Daventry, Northamptonshire, England, the fifth son of Edmund Burton, solicitor, and his wife Eliza, a daughter of the Rev. John Mather. His uncle Charles Burton was a High Court judge who had a long and distinguished career in Ireland. Burton was educated at Daventry Grammar School and entered the Royal Navy as a midshipman in 1807 and served in the Conqueror under Thomas Fellowes, a very strict disciplinarian and later a rear-admiral. He saw service off Toulon in 1811, and at New Orleans in 1814. He later served in the Barham, Tonnant and Ortando, and visited Lisbon, Cadiz, the Canaries, the Mediterranean, the East and West Indies and China.

Legal career

Burton then studied law, entering the Inner Temple in November 1819, and was called to the bar in November 1824. He was recorder of Daventry in 1826–1827, and a puisne judge of the supreme court at the Cape of Good Hope 1828–1832, and then transferred to the Supreme Court at Sydney. In July 1834 he went to Norfolk Island to preside over the trial of some convict leaders who had mutinied. Thirteen were sentenced to death, but as no clergy were on the island, Burton reprieved them until their cases could go before the executive council and clergy could be sent to the island. He endeavoured also with some success to improve the miserable conditions of the convicts; Burton being a religious man, arranged that two of the prisoners should act as catechists to the others until clergy could be procured. Eventually, both Protestant and Roman Catholic chaplains were appointed. Burton gave an account of the position at Norfolk Island in his book The State of Religion and Education in New South Wales, (1840). Two years later he published The Insolvent Law of New South Wales, with Practical Directions and Forms.

Following the brutal killing of 28 unarmed Aboriginal Australians in the Myall Creek massacre on 10 June 1838, Burton presided over the second trial in which a jury convicted seven colonists of the murder of two children and an adult (referred to as "Charley").

In 1844, Burton was appointed a judge at Madras, leaving New South Wales on 6 July 1844, three months before the death of Chief Justice Sir James Dowling. He was knighted in 1844. Burton carried out his judicial duties at Madras in a capable way and on his retirement returned to Sydney in 1857.

Political career
Burton was nominated to the Legislative Council and sworn in on 11 August 1857. In March 1858 he was appointed its President by the Governor. In May 1861, on account of the council having insisted on amendments to two measures brought forward by the government, the crown lands alienation bill and the crown lands occupation bill, an attempt was made to swamp the chamber by appointing 21 new members. When the council met and the new members were waiting to be sworn in, Burton stated that he felt he had been treated with discourtesy in the matter, resigned his office of president and his membership, and left the chamber followed by several others. The house was adjourned, and as the session had nearly closed it was impossible to do anything until the next session. When the council was reconstituted later a compromise was come to, under which practically the whole of the 21 proposed new members were not again nominated; but Burton also was not nominated.

Late life
Burton went to England in 1861 and lived in retirement. He was blind in his later years and when about 90 dictated a letter congratulating George William Rusden on his History of Australia which had been read to him. He died aged 94 on 6 August 1888.

Burton married (1) Margaret, daughter of Leny Smith, a crêpe manufacturer of Hackney Wick, London, and (2)  his cousin Maria Alphonsine, daughter of John Beattie West, MP for   Dublin City, and Elizabeth Felicia Burton, the daughter of William's Uncle Charles.

See also
List of judges of the Supreme Court of New South Wales

References

1794 births
1888 deaths
People from Daventry
19th-century English judges
Judges of the Supreme Court of New South Wales
Colony of New South Wales judges
Knights Bachelor
Members of the New South Wales Legislative Council
Presidents of the New South Wales Legislative Council
19th-century Australian politicians
19th-century Australian judges